Reuben A. Knoblauch (December 22, 1914 – November 13, 1992) was an American politician in the state of Washington. He served in the Washington House of Representatives from 1947 to 1953 and in the Senate from 1953 to 1977.

References

1992 deaths
1914 births
Democratic Party Washington (state) state senators
Democratic Party members of the Washington House of Representatives
20th-century American politicians
People from Sumner, Washington